Hoërskool Staatspresident C R Swart is an English high school situated in Waverley, Pretoria, one of the Eastern suburbs of Pretoria, South Africa.

History
The school is named after His Excellency C R Swart the first State President of the Republic of South Africa

Notable alumni

External links

Hspcrswart.co.za

Afrikaner culture in Pretoria
Schools in Gauteng
Afrikaans-language schools